Nikolai Mikhailovich Filatov (24 February 1935) was a Russian scientist in the field of theory of shooting from small arms.

Filatov graduated from the Mikhailovskaya Artillery Academy in 1887 and became a teacher at the Moscow Infantry School. In 1892-1917, he taught at the Oranienbaum Officer Shooting School and tested automatic small firearms at the firing range on school premises, which he had founded in 1905. Nikolai Filatov was the one to support the work of the first Russian inventors and automatic weapons designers, such as Vladimir Fyodorov, Fedor Tokarev, Yakov Roshchepey, Vasily Degtyaryov and others.

After the October Revolution, Nikolai Filatov assisted in preparing the first Soviet infantry officer personnel. In 1918, he was appointed director of the Higher Shooting School of the Red Army, created on the basis of the Oranienbaum Officer Shooting School. In 1922, Nikolai Filatov became chairman of the shooting committee of the Red Army and then infantry inspection member. He authored the Notes on the Theory of Shooting ("Записки по теории стрельбы"; 1897) and many other works. Nikolai Filatov was awarded the Order of the Red Banner of Labour.

External links
 Филатов, Николай Михайлович Great Soviet Encyclopedia (in Russian)

1862 births
1935 deaths
People from Ferzikovsky District
People from Kaluzhsky Uyezd
Firearm designers
Scientists from the Russian Empire
Soviet scientists
Soviet engineers
Imperial Russian lieutenant generals
Russian military personnel of World War I
Soviet military personnel of the Russian Civil War
Recipients of the Order of St. Vladimir, 3rd class
Recipients of the Order of St. Vladimir, 4th class
Recipients of the Order of St. Anna, 1st class
Recipients of the Order of St. Anna, 3rd class
Recipients of the Order of Saint Stanislaus (Russian), 1st class
Recipients of the Order of Saint Stanislaus (Russian), 2nd class
Recipients of the Order of Saint Stanislaus (Russian), 3rd class
Recipients of the Order of the Red Banner of Labour